The 2004 Quetta Ashura massacre is the sectarian terrorist attack on Tuesday 2 March 2004 during an Ashura procession in the southwestern city of Quetta, in the Balochistan province of Pakistan. At least 42 persons were killed and more than 100 wounded in the attack. The attack took place in Liaqat Bazaar Quetta, almost all of the victims were from the Hazara ethnic minority of Balochistan. The incident occurred just after the incident of the Karbala Ashura bombings in Iraq.

Background
The Shia Muslim's processions are held throughout world to commemorate the martyrdom of Imam Hussain Ibn Ali every year on the Day of Ashura. Like other parts of Pakistan, Quetta city has a notable population of Shia Muslims who mainly belong to Hazara community. In Quetta, the Ashura procession starts from Alamdar Road, where all the Imambargahs gather from around the city mainly from Hazara Town, then the procession moves to Mezan Chowk, where prayers are offered, and Matam was performed then moves to Liaqat Bazaar and ends on Alamdar Road.

Massacre
The Ashura procession was on its traditional route, when it reached the main Bazaar, three terrorist from top a building, threw hand grenades followed by firing with automatic weapons before they blew themselves up, which left around 50 dead and more 100 injured.

Perpetrators
The police identified the assailants bodies after DNA tests and investigations. They belonged to Lashkar-e-Jhangvi (LeJ), the banned Pakistani terrorist group. The Police arrested a police constable who allegedly allowed the terrorist to use his house to plan the attack.

Funeral
A mass funeral was arranged the next day.

Response and reactions
United Nations Secretary General Kofi Annan condemned the attacks and named it a cowardly act.

The, Secretary-General of Organization of Islamic Conference (OIC), Abdulwahed Belkeziz said 

The Embassy of Japan in Islamabad issued a press release 

Interior Minister of Pakistan, Faisal Saleh Hayat condemned the attack and said

See also

Persecution of Hazara people
List of terrorist incidents, 2004

References

2004 murders in Pakistan
2000s in Quetta
21st-century mass murder in Pakistan
Persecution of Hazaras
Massacres of Hazara people
Massacres in 2004
Massacres in Pakistan
Terrorist incidents in Pakistan in 2004
Terrorist incidents in Quetta
Spree shootings in Pakistan
21st-century human rights abuses
Religious pluralism
Lashkar-e-Jhangvi attacks
March 2004 events in Pakistan
March 2004 crimes
Violence against Shia Muslims in Pakistan